Ganus is a monotypic genus of planthoppers in the tribe Delphacini, erected by Jinhua Ding in 2006.  It contains the species Ganus pallicarinatus from China.

References

External links 
 

Auchenorrhyncha genera
Delphacinae